The list of shipwrecks in February 1829 includes some ships sunk, wrecked or otherwise lost during February 1829.

2 February

3 February

5 February

7 February

8 February

9 February

11 February

13 February

15 February

17 February

21 February

22 February

23 February

25 February

26 February

27 February

28 February

Unknown date

References

1829-02